Break My Heart may refer to:
 "Break My Heart" (Hilary Duff song) (2005)
 "Break My Heart" (Victoria Duffield song) (2012)
 "Break My Heart" (Estelle song) (2011)
 "Break My Heart" (Todrick Hall song) (2018)
 "Break My Heart" (Hey Violet song) (2017)
 "Break My Heart" (Dua Lipa song) (2020)
 "Break My Heart" (Malcolm Middleton song) (2005)
 "Break My Heart (You Really)", a 1988 song by Shakespears Sister

See also
 "Break Your Heart", a 2009 song by Taio Cruz
 "Un-Break My Heart", a 1996 song by Toni Braxton